Daspur is a village, with a police station, in Daspur I CD Block in Ghatal subdivision of Paschim Medinipur district  in the state of West Bengal, India.

History
Daspur is a very old establishment, British made their barrack in this area in early seventeenth century,

Geography

Location

Area overview
Ishwar Chandra Vidyasagar, scholar, social reformer and a key figure of the Bengal Renaissance, was born at Birsingha on 26 September 1820.

Ghatal subdivision, shown in the map alongside, has alluvial soils. Around 85% of the total cultivated area is cropped more than once. It  has a density of population of 1,099 per km2, but being a small subdivision only a little over a fifth of the people in the district reside in this subdivision. 14.33% of the population lives in urban areas and 86.67% lives in the rural areas.

Note: The map alongside presents some of the notable locations in the subdivision. All places marked in the map are linked in the larger full screen map.

Demographics
As per 2011 Census of India Daspur had a total population of 3,667 of which 1,878 (51%) were males and 1,789 (49%) were females. Population below 6 years was 435. The total number of literates in Daspur was 2,957 (80.64% of the population over 6 years).

Civic administration

CD block HQ
The headquarters of Daspur I block are located at Daspur.

Police station
Daspur police station has jurisdiction over Daspur I and Daspur II  CD blocks.

Culture
David J. McCutchion mentions the following temples in Daspur town:
The Gopinatha temple as an ek-ratna with a ridged rekha tower of the smaller Bishunupur type with single porch, brick-built in 1716, measuring around 21’ square, having rich terracotta façade.
The Shyama-Raya temple as an ek-ratna with smooth rekha tower of the smaller Daspur type generally with the tower displaced to the back, measuring around 24’ square, built in 1699. The ruinous tower seemed to have been at the corner. 
The Lakshmi-Janardana temple of the Pal family as a pancha-ratna with smooth rekha tuurrets and porch on three arches. Measuring around 18’ square, it was built in 1847 and richly terra-cotta decorated.
The abandoned temple of the Chakravarti family, also in the same category as the Lakshmi-Janardana temple, measuring around 17’ 8” square, built in 1847and richly terracotta decorated.

The Gopinatha temple is a state protected monument.

Daspur (town) picture gallery

Transport
State Highway 4 running from Jhalda (in Purulia district) to Digha (in Purba Medinipur district) passes through Daspur.

Healthcare
Daspur Rural Hospital, with 30 beds at Daspur is the major government medical facility in the Daspur I CD block.

References

External links

Villages in Paschim Medinipur district